In mathematics, the two families c(x;k) and B(x;k) of sieved ultraspherical polynomials, introduced by Waleed Al-Salam, W.R. Allaway and Richard Askey in 1984, are the archetypal examples of sieved orthogonal polynomials. Their recurrence relations are a modified (or "sieved") version of the recurrence relations for ultraspherical polynomials.

Recurrence relations

For the sieved ultraspherical polynomials of the first kind the recurrence relations are
 if n is not divisible by k

For the sieved ultraspherical polynomials of the second kind the recurrence relations are
 if n is not divisible by k

References

Orthogonal polynomials